Jacqueline Humphrey-Corbin (née Humphrey, formerly Tompkins; born September 30, 1965) is an American former hurdler. She won the 100 metres hurdles title at the 1988 US Olympic Trials and went on to compete in the women's 100 metres hurdles at the 1988 Seoul Olympics, where she reached the semifinals.

Career
Humphrey ran her lifetime best 100m hurdles time of 12.83 secs to win the second semifinal at the 1988 US Olympic Trials, before going on to win the final later the same day in 12.88, to defeat Gail Devers (12.90) and LaVonna Martin (192.93) and earn Olympic selection. At the Seoul Olympics, she ran 13.24 in the first round and 13.25 in the second round (quarterfinals) to reach the semifinals, where she was eliminated running 13.59. At both the 1992 and 1996 Olympic trials, she missed out on the semifinals by just one place.

Competition record

References

External links
 

1965 births
Living people
Athletes (track and field) at the 1988 Summer Olympics
American female hurdlers
Olympic track and field athletes of the United States
Place of birth missing (living people)
21st-century American women
20th-century American women